Bad science may refer to:
 Antiscience
 Cargo cult science
 Fabrication (science)
 Fringe science
 Junk science
 Pathological science
 Pseudoscience
 Publication bias
 Scientific misconduct
 The "Bad Science" column by Ben Goldacre in The Guardian
 Bad Science (Goldacre book), a 2008 book by Ben Goldacre
 Bad Science (Taubes book), a 1993 book by Gary Taubes